Willisau & Taktlos is an album by Swiss jazz pianist Irène Schweizer with saxophonist Fred Anderson and drummer Hamid Drake, which was released by Intakt Records. The opening piece by the duo Schweizer-Drake was recorded at the Taktlos-Festival Zürich in 1998 and the other three improvisations by the trio were recorded at Jazzfestival Willisau in 2004.

Reception

In his review for AllMusic, Alain Drouot states "The quieter passages certainly betray her European origins, but are not a distraction from this otherwise energetic, soulful, and pleasurable set."

The All About Jazz review by Nic Jones says "All three players are deeply alert to the integral values of free playing and they mine the seam so deeply that it seems as though their creativity is bottomless."

Track listing
''All compositions by Schweizer, Anderson, Drake except as indicated
 "A Former Dialogue" (Schweizer-Drake) - 21:59
 "Trinity" - 28:55
 "Schwandrake" - 10:16
 "Willisau" - 7:41

Personnel
Irène Schweizer - piano
Fred Anderson - saxophone
Hamid Drake - drums

References

2007 live albums
Intakt Records live albums
Irène Schweizer live albums